Marc S. Feinstein is a Democratic member of the South Dakota House of Representatives, representing District 14 from 2007-2015.

External links
South Dakota Legislature - Marc Feinstein official SD House website

Project Vote Smart - Representative Marc S. Feinstein (SD) profile
Follow the Money - Marc Feinstein
2008 2006 campaign contributions

Democratic Party members of the South Dakota House of Representatives
1953 births
Living people
People from Mitchell, South Dakota
Politicians from Sioux Falls, South Dakota
Stanford University alumni
University of South Dakota School of Law alumni
University of Florida alumni
Jewish American state legislators in South Dakota
South Dakota lawyers
21st-century American Jews